Dov S. Zakheim (born December 18, 1948) is an American businessman, writer, and former official of the United States government. In the Reagan administration, he held various Department of Defense positions. In 2000, Zakheim was a member of "The Vulcans", a group of foreign policy advisors assisting George W. Bush's presidential campaign.

Early life and education
Zakheim was born in Brooklyn and graduated from Yeshiva University High School in 1966. He earned his Bachelor of Arts degree in government from Columbia University in 1970 and PhD in economics and politics from St. Antony's College, Oxford University in 1974. He is Jewish.

Career
Zakheim was an adjunct professor at the National War College, Yeshiva University, Columbia University and Trinity College, where he was presidential scholar.

Zakheim served in various Department of Defense posts during the Reagan administration, including Deputy Undersecretary of Defense for Planning and Resources from 1985 to 1987. There was some controversy in both the U.S. and Israel over Zakheim's involvement in ending the Israeli fighter program, the IAI Lavi. He argued that Israeli and U.S. interests would be best served by having Israel purchase F-16 fighters, rather than investing in an entirely new aircraft. He left government service in 1987 and joined the technology and analysis firm System Planning Corporation as its corporate vice president.

Zakheim signed a letter to Bill Clinton about Iraq. During the 2000 U.S. Presidential election campaign, Zakheim served as a foreign policy advisor to George W. Bush as part of a group led by Condoleezza Rice that called itself "The Vulcans".

From 1987–2001, Zakheim was CEO of SPC International, a subsidiary of System Planning Corporation, a high-technology analytical firm. During that period he served as a consultant to the Office of the Secretary of Defense, and sat on a number of major DoD panels, including its Task Force on Defense Reform (1997) and the DoD's first Board of Visitors of Overseas Regional Centers (1998–2001). In September 2000 Zakheim is also a member of the Council on Foreign Relations, the International Institute for Strategic Studies, and the United States Naval Institute, and a member of the editorial board of the journal The National Interest. He is a three-time recipient of the Department of Defense's highest civilian award, the Distinguished Public Service Medal, as well as other awards for government and community service.

Zakheim was an adjunct scholar of the Heritage Foundation, a senior associate at the Center for Strategic and International Studies, and published over 200 articles and monographs on defense issues.

Zakheim was then appointed as Under Secretary of Defense (Comptroller) from 2001 in George W. Bush administration, and served in the capacity until July 2004. During his term as comptroller, he was tasked to trace the Pentagon's 2.3 trillion dollars' worth of unaccounted transactions. He also played an active role in the Department's system acquisition, strategic planning, programming, and budget process. In 2008, he was appointed by President Bush as a member of the Commission on Wartime Contracting in Iraq and Afghanistan. He was succeeded by Tina W. Jonas as the top budget official at the DoD.

Zakheim retired as a senior vice president of Booz Allen Hamilton in 2010. He is a senior fellow at the CNA Corporation and a senior advisor at the Center for Strategic and International Studies. He is also co-vice chair of Global Panel America with Malcolm Rifkind.

His 2011 book, A Vulcan’s Tale: How the Bush Administration Mismanaged the Reconstruction of Afghanistan, discusses the Bush administration's missed opportunities and struggles to manage two wars, particularly the seemingly endless conflict in Afghanistan.

Zakheim also sits on the Atlantic Council's board of directors.

In the 2020 presidential election, Zakheim, along with over 130 other former Republican national security officials, signed a statement that asserted that President Trump was unfit to serve another term, and "To that end, we are firmly convinced that it is in the best interest of our nation that Vice President Joe Biden be elected as the next President of the United States, and we will vote for him."

Bibliography

Books 
 
 Congress and National Security in the Post-Cold War Era (Nixon Center, 1998)
 Toward a Fortress Europe? (Center for Strategic and International Studies, 2000)
 A Vulcan's Tale (Brookings Institution Press, 2011)
Nehemiah: Statesman and Sage (Koren Publishers, 2016)

References

External links 

 Zakheim's current blog at ForeignPolicy.com
 Zakheim's bio at ForeignPolicy.com
 
Membership at the Council on Foreign Relations

Atlantic Council
1948 births
Living people
Columbia College (New York) alumni
Economists from New York (state)
Alumni of St Antony's College, Oxford
Jewish American government officials
Businesspeople from New York City
The Heritage Foundation
United States Department of Defense officials
American Orthodox Jews
Booz Allen Hamilton people
People from Brooklyn
Reagan administration personnel
George W. Bush administration personnel
New York (state) Republicans
American chief executives
Foreign Policy Research Institute
21st-century American economists
Naval War College Review people
United States Under Secretaries of Defense